Massachusetts's 5th congressional district is a congressional district in eastern Massachusetts. The district is represented by Katherine Clark.

Massachusetts congressional redistricting after the 2020 census (commencing with the 2022 election and the 118th Congress, whose House Members were sworn in on January 7, 2023) assigns the 5th congressional district to much of Middlesex County (including cities of Framingham, Malden, Medford, Melrose, Natick, Waltham, Watertown and Woburn, towns of Arlington, Lexington, Lincoln, Maynard, Stoneham, Sudbury, Wayland, Weston and Winchester, part of city of Cambridge and part of town of Belmont, part of Norfolk County (including part of town of Wellesley) and part of Suffolk County (including city of Revere and town of Winthrop).

Massachusetts congressional redistricting after the 2010 census changed the borders of the district starting with the elections of 2012, with the new 3rd district largely taking the place of the old 5th. The 5th district covers many of the communities represented in the old 7th district. From 2013 through 2022 the municipalities of the 5th District were Arlington, Ashland, Belmont, parts of Cambridge, Framingham, Holliston, Lexington, Lincoln, Malden, Medford, Melrose, Natick, Revere, Sherborn, Southborough, Stoneham, parts of Sudbury, Waltham, Watertown, Wayland, Weston, Winchester, Winthrop, and Woburn, which are primarily found in Middlesex as well as Suffolk and Worcester Counties. As of 2010, the population of the 5th congressional district was 727,515. On July 15, 2013, Ed Markey resigned from the seat to become the junior Senator from Massachusetts. On December 10, 2013, Democrat Katherine Clark won a special election to fill the seat for the remainder of the 113th Congress. She was sworn into office on December 12, 2013, and serves as the Assistant Speaker of the United States House of Representatives for the 117th Congress.

Demographics
The district has been in Democratic hands without interruption since 1975.  Before Paul Tsongas' victory that year, it had only elected three Democrats in its entire existence and had been in Republican hands since 1895.

It was one of the more moderate districts in heavily Democratic Massachusetts before redistricting in 2013. In state races, it supported Republican candidates for Governor William Weld, Paul Celluci, and Mitt Romney.  In the 2007 special election to replace Marty Meehan, Republican candidate Jim Ogonowski ran an unexpectedly strong race, ultimately losing 51-45%.

Election results from presidential races

Recent election results

List of members representing the district

References

Further reading
 
 
 Congressional Biographical Directory of the United States 1774–present

External links

Maps 
 Map of Massachusetts's 5th Congressional District, via Massachusetts Secretary of the Commonwealth

Election results 
 CNN.com 2004 election results
 CNN.com 2006 election results
 Associated Press 2007 election results
 Massachusetts Elections Division 2008 Return of Votes

05
Government of Essex County, Massachusetts
Government of Middlesex County, Massachusetts
Government in Worcester County, Massachusetts
1789 establishments in Massachusetts
Constituencies established in 1789